Estadio Municipal de La Cisterna is a multi-use stadium in Santiago, Chile.  It is currently used mostly for football matches and hosts the home matches for Palestino.  The stadium currently holds 8,000 people and was built in 1988.

The highest attendance at the Municipal de La Cisterna was 11,680 for a 0-0 Primera Division league match between Palestino and Universidad de Chile on October 16, 1988

External links
 Stadium images

References

Mu
Municipal de La Cisterna
Club Deportivo Palestino
Sports venues completed in 1988
1988 establishments in Chile